Reunited is the eighth  studio album by South African duo Mafikizolo. It was released physically on 10 April 2013 and digitally on 11 April 2013 via iTunes. "Khona", the album's lead single, debuted on January 10, 2013, and was met with critical acclaim.

Reunited bagged three awards Album of the Year, Duo/Group of the Year and Best Pop Album at the 20th South African Music Awards in 2014.

Track listing

Accolades
The Reunited earned the duo numerous 
awards at 20th South African Music Awards for Album of the Year, Duo or Group of the Year, Best Pop Album, Best Collaboration, Best Selling Ring-back Tone, Record of the Year, Download of the Year

|-
|rowspan="8"|2014
|rowspan="3"| Reunited
| Album of the Year
|
|-
|Duo/Group of the Year
|
|-
|Best Pop Album
|
|-
|"Happiness"
|Best Collaboration 
|
|-
|rowspan="4"|"Khona"
|Record of the Year 
|
|-
|Best Selling Ring-back Tone
|
|-
|Download of the Year
|
|-
|Best Selling Full-track Download
|

References

2013 albums
House music albums by South African artists
Albums produced by Uhuru (record producer)
Kalawa Jazmee Records albums